Sirkus is a 2018 Philippine television drama fantasy series broadcast by GMA Network. Directed by Zig Dulay, it stars Mikoy Morales and Mikee Quintos. It premiered on January 21, 2018 on the network's Sunday Grande sa Gabi line up replacing Road Trip. The series concluded on April 15, 2018 with a total of 13 episodes.

The series is streaming online on YouTube.

Premise
Miko and Mia, ran away with a travelling circus to escape a person who is after them. After their parents disappeared, they rely on the protection of a group of circus performers that include a magician, a fire-breather, an acrobat, a strongman, and a clairvoyant. They will discover that their new circus family is a group of magical folk in disguise. The circus becomes key to revealing the truth about their identities, as they will eventually discover that they have their own powers.

Cast and characters

Lead cast
 Mikoy Morales as Miko
 Mikee Quintos as Mia

Supporting cast
 Cherie Gil as Lara "La Ora"
 Gardo Versoza as Leviticus "Levi"
 Andre Paras as Martel
 Sef Cadayona as Al
 Chariz Solomon as Astra
 Klea Pineda as Sefira
 Divine Tetay as Luca
 Gerry Acao as Facundo 

Guest cast
 Angelu de Leon as Liza
 Zoren Legaspi as Miguel
 Gina Alajar as Waya
 Noel Trinidad as Lolo
 Erlinda Villalobos as Lola
 David Remo as young Levi
 Barbara Miguel as young Lara
 Addy Raj as Sandino
 Lou Veloso as Nuno Ben
 Elizabeth Oropesa as Victorina
 Sue Prado as Nemila 
 Bruce Roeland as Magsino
 Ashley Ortega as Lila
 Fanny Serrano as Veritas

Episodes

Ratings
According to AGB Nielsen Philippines' Nationwide Urban Television Audience Measurement People in television homes, the pilot episode of Sirkus earned an 8.6% rating. The series got its highest rating on January 28, 2018 with an 8.7% rating.

Accolades

References

External links
 
 

2018 Philippine television series debuts
2018 Philippine television series endings
Fantaserye and telefantasya
Filipino-language television shows
GMA Network drama series
GMA Integrated News and Public Affairs shows